Bargmann is a surname. Notable people with the surname include:

Cornelia Bargmann (born 1961), American neurobiologist
Valentine Bargmann (1908–1989), German-American mathematician and theoretical physicist

See also
Bargmann transform or Segal–Bargmann space
Bargmann-Michel-Telegdi equation
Bargmann-Wigner equations
Bagman